Tonkin + Taylor is an employee-owned environmental and engineering consultancy company. It is based in Auckland, New Zealand with offices in Australia, Malaysia and the wider Asia Pacific region. 

Services cover civil, environmental, geotechnical and water resources engineering.

History
In 1959, Ralph Tonkin established a laboratory testing and engineering consulting company Geotechnics Ltd, with technical input from Professor Peter Taylor of University of Auckland. In 1961, Ralph Tonkin and Don Taylor formed a partnership named Tonkin + Taylor. The partnership was active in many engineering projects in New Zealand and Asia, and founded an office in Malaysia in the 1970s.

In 1981, the partnership was restructured into a limited liability company, which has grown into an employee owned company.

Awards
 2014 Waterview Connection Project
 Year in Infrastructure Conference Innovation in Roads Award, awarded to the Well Connected Alliance (NZ Transport Agency, Fletcher Construction, McConnell Dowell Constructors, Beca Infrastructure, Tonkin + Taylor, Parsons Brinkerhoff and Obayashi Corporation)
 2013 Newmarket Viaduct Replacement Project
 ACENZ Innovate NZ Awards Gold Award
 NZ Contractors Federation Civil Construction Excellence Award
 FIDIC Civil Construction Excellence Award
 NZ Concrete Society Infrastructure and Concrete Award
 NZ Engineering Excellence Awards Transportation Infrastructure Award
 Roading Excellence Awards Supreme Award (Major Road Project)
 2012 Land Damage Assessment Team, Christchurch
 ACENZ Gold Award of Excellence
 2011 Rosedale Wastewater Outfall Tunnel, North Shore
 ACENZ Gold Award of Excellence
 Ingenium Excellence Award (Winner - Projects over $10 million)
 New Zealand Contractors Federation Construction Award
 New Zealand Engineering Excellence Awards (Winner - Water Waste and Amenities Category)
 2011 Silverstream Landfill Development, Hutt City
 ACENZ Merit Award of Excellence
 Ingenium Excellence Awards for Physical Works (Finalist - Projects over $10 million)
 New Zealand Engineering Excellence Awards (Finalist - Water Waste and Amenities Category)

See also
ACENZ

References

Engineering companies of New Zealand
Employee-owned companies
New Zealand companies established in 1959